John R. Casani  (born September 17, 1932) is an American engineer. He worked for the National Aeronautics and Space Administration (NASA) at the Jet Propulsion Laboratory, where he managed the Voyager, Galileo, Cassini and Prometheus projects.

Casani was elected a member of the National Academy of Engineering in 1989 for pioneering systems engineering of planetary spacecraft and for leadership of spacecraft engineering and science teams.

Early life 
John R. Casani was born in Philadelphia, Pennsylvania, on September 17, 1932. He attended St. Joseph's Preparatory School, where he studied no scientific technical subjects. He then entered the University of Pennsylvania with the intention of becoming a liberal arts major. During his sophomore year, he decided that the employment prospects for liberal arts majors were unpromising, and decided to join the United States Air Force. When his father objected, he decided instead to major in electrical engineering like his college roommate. The roommate eventually dropped out, but Casani received his Bachelor of Science degree in the discipline in 1955.

Jet Propulsion Laboratory 

After graduation Casani worked at the Rome Air Development Center in New York state. In 1956 he moved to Southern California, where he lived in his fraternity's house at the University of Southern California while looking for work. He was offered a position at North American Aviation working its Navaho missile project, but Jack James convinced him to join the Jet Propulsion Laboratory (JPL), where he worked on the guidance system for the Army Ballistic Missile Agency's Jupiter missile until the Sputnik crisis resulted in a change of priorities.

From 1958 to 1959, Casani was a payload engineer working on Pioneer 3 and Pioneer 4. These spacecraft were so small that he carried them in a suitcase to the University of Iowa to have their instruments calibrated. He worked as a spacecraft systems engineer on Ranger 1 and Ranger 2 from 1959 to 1962, and then on the Mariner 3 and Mariner 4 Mars probes from 1962 to 1965. He became the Chief Engineer of the Mariner Mars project in 1965, Deputy Spacecraft System Manager in 1966, Spacecraft System Manager in 1969, and Project Manager in 1970. Early missions to Mars were dogged by failures, which a reporter attributed to the Great Galactic Ghoul. After a hiatus, the Ghoul returned on Mariner 7, and Casani received drawing and paintings of the Ghoul.

Casani served as project manager for the Voyager program from 1975 to 1977, and then the Galileo from 1977 to 1988. This project was troubled by multiple delays and changes in configuration due to uncertainty as to how it should be launched on its way to Jupiter, and delays caused by the Space Shuttle Challenger disaster. It remained in orbit around Jupiter until 2003. He became the Deputy Assistant Laboratory Director for Flight Projects in 1988, and Assistant Laboratory Director for Flight Projects from in 1989. In 1994 he became Project Manager of the Cassini project. He became Chief Engineer at JPL in 1994.

Casani retired in 1999, but the retirement was a brief one; he was recalled two weeks later to work with the Johnson Space Center on a problem that could have caused the loss of the Shuttle Radar Topography Mission. He then headed up an internal JPL investigation of the loss of the Mars Climate Orbiter, Mars Polar Lander and Deep Space 2 probes, and was project manager for Project Prometheus until its termination in 2005.

Awards 

Over a long career at the JPL, Casani received many awards, including the NASA Distinguished Service Medal in 1991, the NASA Exceptional Service Medal in 1965, the NASA Exceptional Achievement Medal in 1999 and 2000), and the NASA Outstanding Leadership Medal in 1974 and 1981. He received the Management Improvement Award for the Mariner Venus Mercury mission in 1974, the American Institute of Aeronautics and Astronautics' Space Systems Award in 1979, and the National Aerospace Club's Astronautics Engineer Award in 1981 for the Galileo project. He was also awarded the von Karman Lectureship in 1990, the American Astronautical Society Space Flight Award in 1989 and William Randolph Lovelace II Award in 2005, and the National Air and Space Museum Trophy for Lifetime Achievement in 2009. He received an honorary doctorate from the University of Pennsylvania in 2000, and from the University of Rome La Sapienza in 2000 for his work on Voyager, Galileo and Cassini.

Notes

External links 
 
 
 
 

1932 births
Engineers from Pennsylvania
Living people
NASA people
Scientists from Philadelphia
St. Joseph's Preparatory School alumni
University of Pennsylvania alumni
Recipients of the NASA Distinguished Service Medal
Recipients of the NASA Exceptional Achievement Medal
Recipients of the NASA Exceptional Service Medal